Romel Kwesi Currency (born 7 May 1982) is a former West Indian cricketer who played first-class cricket and List A cricket for the Windward Islands. He was born at Mesopotamia on Saint Vincent.

Currency made his debut for the Windward Islands in 2000, playing for the side until the 2014/15 season. In total he played in 71 first-class matches in his career, including 26 for Combined Campuses and Colleges (CCC) whilst he was a student. He captained the CCC side in the Caribbean T20 tournament between 2010/11 and 2011/12. As of August 2018 Currency and Devon Smith held the record for the highest first-wicket partnership made in first-class cricket by the Windward Islands, scoring 309 runs against Kenya at Kingstown in February 2004, Currency scoring his only first-class century during the partnership.

Sunil Ambris, who has played international cricket for the West Indies, is Currency's younger half-brother. Ambris has said that Currency has been a major influence on his career.

References

External links

1982 births
Living people
Saint Vincent and the Grenadines cricketers
Windward Islands cricketers
Combined Campuses and Colleges cricketers
People from Charlotte Parish, Saint Vincent and the Grenadines